The Berghof Sölden is a residence and former farmstead in Sölden, Austria. The building is one of the original farmsteads in the Sölden region.

Position 
The Berghof is located on the west side of the valley directly above the Sölden town centre.

History 
A building on the site of the Berghof was first mentioned already in 1370. In 1588, the Berghof was listed in the records of St. Petersberg Castle as one of the original farmsteads of Sölden. Since then many other houses have been built around the Berghof, and today this more than 400 year old farmstead serves principally as an alpine lodge with some seasonal agricultural functions. The house is now used as accommodation for guests.

Film location 
In September 1939 portions of the film The Vulture Wally from Hans Steinhoff were shot at the Berghof.

Pictures

External links 
 Berghof anno 1588 Official Site
 Filmposter „Geierwally“ from 1940 www.germanfilms.net

References 

Cities and towns in Imst District